Hilltop Pass is situated in the Mpumalanga province, on the R40 road between Nelspruit and Barberton (South Africa).

References 

Mountain passes of Mpumalanga